Roaring Jack was an Australian Celtic punk/folk punk band of the 1980s and 1990s. The band was nominated for two ARIA Music Awards during their career.

The band's singer Alistair Hulett died at the Southern General Hospital in Glasgow of liver failure and cancer on 28 January 2010. Rod Gilchrist died in 1998 and Steve Thompson in 2000.

History
Roaring Jack played all over Australia from 1985 to 1992 and developed a huge cult following. Their debut EP Street Celtability was recorded and produced at Studios 301 in Sydney in July 1987. First album The Cat Among the Pigeons was released in November 1988.

Discography

Albums

Singles

Awards

ARIA Music Awards
The ARIA Music Awards is an annual awards ceremony that recognises excellence, innovation, and achievement across all genres of Australian music. Roaring Jack were nominated for two awards.

|-
| 1989
| The Cat Among the Pigeons
| ARIA Award for Best New Talent
| 
|-
| 1991
| Through the Smoke of Innocence
| ARIA Award for Best Independent Release
| 
|-

References

Australian punk rock groups
Musical groups established in 1985
Celtic punk groups
Political music groups